External links
New Hampshire Court Locator, A-L
 New Hampshire Court Locator, M-Z
New Hampshire state courts
State Courts